The 1917 Middle Tennessee State Normal football team represented the Middle Tennessee State Normal School (now known as Middle Tennessee State University) during the 1917 college football season. The team captain was Preston Vaughn Overall.

Schedule

References

Middle Tennessee State Normal
Middle Tennessee Blue Raiders football seasons
College football undefeated seasons
Middle Tennessee State Normal football